Stef Collins (born 30 December 1982) is a former basketball player for Great Britain women's national basketball team. She was part of the squad for the 2012 Summer Olympics.

References

1982 births
Living people
British women's basketball players
Basketball players at the 2012 Summer Olympics
Olympic basketball players of Great Britain
Basketball players at the 2018 Commonwealth Games
Commonwealth Games medallists in basketball
Commonwealth Games silver medallists for England
Medallists at the 2018 Commonwealth Games